Namibia Students Financial Assistance Fund (NSFAF) is a government student bursary and loan scheme which provides loans for undergraduate students to help pay for the cost of their tertiary education. It was formed in 1995 and is run under the Ministry of Higher Education.

It helps give financial loans to students from the University of Namibia, Namibia University of Science and Technology and International University of Management.

Establishment
Following the independence of Namibia in 1990. The government began helping underprivileged students gain formal education. In 1995, it formed NSFAF student organization to help educate underprivileged students under the presidency of Sam Nujoma.

Provision of loans and funds
The Namibian government through the treasury releases funds to NSFAF every year to help finance its operations. In 2015, the student fund was given N$700 million. 

However, there have been in the past instances of the funds not accounting to the money given to it.

References

Economy of Namibia
Education in Namibia
Government of Namibia
Education finance